

Chrome yellow is a yellow pigment in paints using monoclinic lead(II) chromate (PbCrO4). It occurs naturally as the mineral crocoite but the mineral ore itself was never used as a pigment for paint. After the French chemist Louis Vauquelin discovered the new element chromium in 1797 lead chromate was synthesized in the laboratory and used as a pigment beginning in the second decade of the nineteenth century.

Chrome yellow had been commonly made by mixing solutions of lead nitrate and potassium chromate and filtering off the lead chromate precipitate.

The pigment tends to react with hydrogen sulfide and darken on exposure to air over time, forming lead sulfide, and it contains the toxic heavy metal lead plus the toxic, carcinogenic chromate. For these reasons, it was replaced by another pigment, cadmium yellow (mixed with enough cadmium orange to produce a color equivalent to chrome yellow). Darkening may also occur from reduction by sulfur dioxide. Good quality pigments have been coated to inhibit contact with gases that can change their color. Cadmium pigments in turn are increasingly replaced with organic pigments such as arylides (Pigment Yellow 65) and isoindoles (PY 110).

After working with the natural mineral crocoite, Nicolas Louis Vauqelin was the first to encourage artists to use chrome yellow as a pigment in 1804. The first recorded use of chrome yellow as a color name in English was in 1818. By 1888, avant-garde artists like Vincent Van Gogh were using chrome yellow with the other two primary colors.

The Piper J-3 Cub aircraft had chrome yellow as its standard overall color, usually called "Cub Yellow" or "Lock Haven Yellow" in aviation circles, from the Piper factory that existed in Lock Haven, Pennsylvania, where it was made in the 1930s and during World War II.

Chrome yellow is a ‘Hero colour’ of the Holden HQ range.

See also
 List of colors
 List of inorganic pigments
 School bus yellow

References

Further reading
 Kühn, H. and Curran, M., Chrome Yellow and Other Chromate Pigments, in Artists’ Pigments. A Handbook of Their History and Characteristics, Vol. 1, L. Feller, Ed., Cambridge University Press, London 1986

External links
 Chrome yellow, Colourlex
 Pichon, A. Pigment degradation: Chrome yellow’s darker side. Nature Chemistry, 5(11), 2013, 897–897. doi:10.1038/nchem.1789

Inorganic pigments
Lead(II) compounds
Chromates
Alchemical substances
Shades of yellow